Jacqueline Doyen (14 February 1930 – 3 September 2006) was a French actress. She appeared in 80 films and television shows between 1956 and 1995.

Filmography

 Le salaire du péché (1956) - (uncredited)
 L'étrange Monsieur Steve (1957)
 La roue (1957)
 Fernand clochard (1957)
 Les oeufs de l'autruche (1957) - (uncredited)
 La bonne tisane (1958) - La capitaine des girls
 Asphalte (1959) - (uncredited)
 Zazie dans le Métro (1960) - Permanent
 A Very Private Affair (1962) - Juliette
 La Vendetta (1962) - (uncredited)
 Parigi o cara (1962)
 We Will Go to Deauville (1962) - Fernande Mercier
 Fleur d'oseille (1967) - Une salope
 Une veuve en or (1969) - La voyante
 L'homme orchestre (1970) - Une automobiliste au feu rouge (uncredited)
 Le cri du cormoran, le soir au-dessus des jonques (1971)
 Le drapeau noir flotte sur la marmite (1971) - Léontine Coulibeaux
 Sex-shop (1972)
 Ursule et Grelu (1974)
 O.K. patron (1974)
 Juliette et Juliette (1974) - Une ouvrière
 On s'est trompé d'histoire d'amour (1974) - La sage-femme
 Comment réussir quand on est con et pleurnichard (1974) - Mme Léonce
 Le rallye des joyeuses (1974) - Soeur Angelique
 Young Casanova (1974) - La baronne D'Ecieux
 Salut les frangines (1975) - Mme Lemoine
 Soldat Duroc, ça va être ta fête! (1975)
 Cher Victor (1975) - Micheline
 Hard Love (1975)
 1Indécences (1975) - Une dame
 Docteur Françoise Gailland (1976) - Raymonde
 Perversions (1976) - Le couple au square
 Cours après moi... que je t'attrape (1976) - La secrétaire de Paul
 L'essayeuse (1976) - Older Female Client
 Le Juge Fayard dit Le Shériff (1977) - Mme Fayolle
 Dis bonjour à la dame!.. (1977) - La mère supérieure
 Dear Inspector (1977) - Madame Melun
 Monsieur Papa (1977)
 Peppermint Soda (1977) - Petitbon
 Take It from the Top (1978) - La mère d'Annie
 Je vous ferai aimer la vie (1979)
 Coup de tête (1979) - Mme Lozerand
 Le coup de sirocco (1979) - Dame de la Croix-Rouge
 Cause toujours... tu m'intéresses! (1979) - La concierge
 Nous maigrirons ensemble (1979) - directrice Weight Watchers
 Gros-Câlin (1979) - Mme Niatte
 Julien Fontanes, magistrat (1980-1986, TV Series) - Sophie Legros / Mme Lanaud / La commère
 Pile ou face (1980)
 Voulez-vous un bébé Nobel? (1980) - Madame Paul
 Viens chez moi, j'habite chez une copine (1981) - La dame au piano
 La vie continue (1981) - Monique
 A Thousand Billion Dollars (1982) - Arlène Robert
 Better Late Than Never (1983) - Head Nurse
 Entre Nous (1983) - Mme Vernier
 Charlots connection (1984) - L'autre tante blanchisseuse
 Le garde du corps (1984) - Yvette, la mère de Paul
 Adieu Blaireau (1985) - Mimi
 The Frog Prince (1985) - Madame Peroche
 Twist again à Moscou (1986)
 Club de rencontres (1987)
 Chouans! (1988) - L'Abesse
 Sam suffit (1992) - La bourgeoise

References

External links

1930 births
2006 deaths
Actresses from Paris
French film actresses
20th-century French actresses